The men's individual large hill/10 km Nordic combined competition for the 2018 Winter Olympics in Pyeongchang, South Korea, was held on 20 February 2018 at the Alpensia Ski Jumping Centre and Alpensia Cross-Country Skiing Centre on 20 February. The defending champion was Jørgen Graabak. The event was won by Johannes Rydzek.  Fabian Rießle, the 2014 bronze medalist, won the silver medal. Eric Frenzel got bronze, completing the German sweep of the podium.

The ski jumping winner, Akito Watabe, and the seventh place, Eero Hirvonen, were separated at the start of the cross-country skiing race by 40 seconds. They soon after the start formed a group and skied together, well ahead of the rest of the field. Wilhelm Denifl dropped out of this group, but the rest went together until the finish. There, the German trio finished ahead of Jarl Magnus Riiber, Watabe, and Hirvonen.

Qualification

Using the Olympic Quota Allocation List and Continental Cup Standings, when no athletes remain in the allocation list (which includes results from July 1, 2016 to January 21, 2018), the top 50 athletes were awarded quotas (with
maximum of five per country). Only maximum of four could be entered into this event. The remaining five quotas were given to countries with three athletes to make a team. If a minimum of ten teams were already formed in the first 50, then the remaining five quotas would be allocated using the allocation list or continental cup standings.

Results

Ski jumping
The ski jumping was held at 19:00.

Cross-country
The cross-country part was held at 21:45.

References

Nordic combined at the 2018 Winter Olympics